VisualARQ is commercial architectural BIM software that works as a plug-in for Rhinoceros CAD application; developed by Asuni CAD, based in Barcelona, Spain. It is aimed at Rhinoceros users and professionals working in the architecture sector such as architects, interior designers and developers. It competes with Architectural Desktop, Revit and ArchiCAD.

History
It was first implemented as a plug-in for AutoCAD and AutoCAD LT released in 2000, as a competitor to Architectural Desktop, another AEC plug-in for AutoCAD developed by Autodesk.

Releases

Reviews
 Reviewed by Nigel Gough on Australian Association of Architectural Illustrators Inc.

See also 
 Comparison of CAD editors for CAE

References

External links 

 
 Official blog

Building information modeling